The Costa do Marisco ("Shellfish Coast") is a Galician translation of the original Spanish 1950s term given as a label to the entire coast of Galicia in Spain. The term can be translated into English as the “Shellfish Coast”.

International surf competitions 
The Ferrolterra Pantin Classic annually attracts international figures in the world of surf.
Doninos, Esmelle and St. George's Beach to the north of the province of A Coruña is marked by the quality of its beaches; most of them are ideal for water sports, such as surfing.

Major commercial and fishing ports

Costa da Morte
 Camariñas - Fishing port - Costa da Morte
 Fisterra - Fishing Port - Costa da Morte
 Malpica de Bergantiños - Fishing port - Costa da Morte

Rías Altas

 Burela - Fishing port - Rías Altas
 Cariño - Fishing port - Rías Altas
 Cedeira - Fishing port - Rías Altas
 Espasante - Fishing port - Rías Altas
 Ferrol - Commercial and military port - Rías Altas
 Foz - Fishing port - Rías Altas
 Ribadeo - Fishing port - Rías Altas
 San Cibrao - Commercial fishing port - Rías Altas
 Viveiro - Fishing port - Rías Altas

Rías Baixas
 Baiona - Fishing port - Rías Baixas
 Bueu - Fishing port - Rías Baixas
 Cangas do Morrazo - Fishing port - Rías Baixas
 Marin - Commercial port - Rías Baixas
 Santa Uxía de Ribeira - Fishing port - Rías Baixas
 Vigo - Commercial fishing port - Rías Baixas

Marisco
Landforms of Galicia (Spain)
Coasts of the Atlantic Ocean